Unirea Tricolor București was a Romanian football club from Bucharest, south-east Romania, founded in 1914 as Tricolor București. It was one of the most famous inter-war clubs in Romania.

History

Tricolor București

Tricolor, first named Teiul, was set up in 1914, in the district of Obor, by some high-school students. Among the first players was Costel Rădulescu, a 1930s coach and manager of the Romania national team and co-founder of the modern national championship system (league system). 

After World War I, the club became champion of the Bucharest Region and played in the final tournament of the National Championship. 

They finished once runner-up in the Liga I in 1919–20 and once they won the national championship in 1920–21. In 1921–22 the club was knocked out in the semifinals by Victoria Cluj after the team from Bucharest failed to appear, so it lost the game with 0–3, by administrative decision.

On September 23, 1923, the team wins the first game of a Romanian club against a former Yugoslavian club (Beogradski Belgrad: 2–1).

In 1926 it merged with "Unirea" taking on the name of Unirea Tricolor. Unirea, was founded in 1924, after the merging of "Orizontul" and "Zburătorii", in the same district of Obor as the above Tricolorul.

Unirea Tricolor București

The President and owner of the team was Nicolae Lucescu, and a famous public character around Unirea Tricolor was Titi Barosanu, a leader of the fans.

In 1947–1948, due to Communist regime norms (stating that all sports associations had to join a form of trade-union, or a governmental institution), the team is taken over by the Ministry of Internal Affairs and, on May 14, 1948, merged with another club, Ciocanul București (former Maccabi), the new teams being named Dinamo "A" and Dinamo "B".

In the 1947–1948 season, they played as Dinamo "A" (Ciocanul) and Dinamo "B" (Unirea Tricolor), and next season, in Divizia A remained only one, Dinamo "A" (later Dinamo București), Dinamo "B" (Unirea Tricolor) being relegated to the Divizia B.

In the 1950 season Dinamo "B" (Unirea Tricolor) moved to Braşov as Dinamo Braşov, in 1957–1958 it moved again, this time to Cluj-Napoca, only to disappear after the 1957–58 season after the team was dissolved and the players were relocated to Dinamo Bacău.

Chronology of names

Honours

Liga I:
Winners (2): 1920–21, 1940–41
Liga II:
Winners (4): 1938–39, 1946–47, 1948–49, 1950

Romanian Cup:
Runners-up (2): 1935–36, 1940–41

Bibliography

Mihai Ionescu, Mircea Tudoran – Fotbal de la A la Z. Fotbalul românesc de-a lungul anilor, București, Editura Sport-Turism, 1984

References

Association football clubs established in 1914
Association football clubs disestablished in 1958
Football clubs in Bucharest
Defunct football clubs in Romania
History of Bucharest
Liga I clubs
Liga II clubs
1914 establishments in Romania
1958 disestablishments in Romania